Acyrthosiphon is a genus of aphids belonging to the family Aphididae.

The genus was described in 1914 by Alexander Mordvilko.

The genus has cosmopolitan distribution.

Species
These species belong to the genus Acyrthosiphon:

 Acyrthosiphon argus Miyazaki, 1991
 Acyrthosiphon artibreve Zhang, 1981
 Acyrthosiphon assiniboinensis Robinson, 1973
 Acyrthosiphon astragali Eastop, 1971
 Acyrthosiphon auctum (Walker, 1849)
 Acyrthosiphon auriculae Martin, 1981
 Acyrthosiphon bidenticola Smith, 1960
 Acyrthosiphon bistorti
 Acyrthosiphon boreale Hille Ris Lambers, 1952
 Acyrthosiphon brachysiphon Hille Ris Lambers, 1952
 Acyrthosiphon brevicorne Hille Ris Lambers, 1960
 Acyrthosiphon capitellum Zhang, 1998
 Acyrthosiphon caraganae (Cholodkovsky, 1907) (caragana aphid)
 Acyrthosiphon chelidonii (Kaltenbach, 1843)
 Acyrthosiphon churchillense Robinson, 1979
 Acyrthosiphon corsicae Remaudière & Leclant, 2000
 Acyrthosiphon crepidis
 Acyrthosiphon cyparissiae (Koch, 1855)
 Acyrthosiphon daphnidis Ilharco, 1996
 Acyrthosiphon dauricum Szelegiewicz, 1963
 Acyrthosiphon dryasae Pashtshenko, 2005
 Acyrthosiphon echinospartii Nieto Nafria & Mier Durante, 1987
 Acyrthosiphon elaeocarpi Tao, 1963
 Acyrthosiphon emeljanovi Mordvilko, 1914
 Acyrthosiphon ericetorum Hille Ris Lambers, 1959
 Acyrthosiphon euphorbiae Börner, 1940
 Acyrthosiphon evodiae
 Acyrthosiphon extremiorientale Pashtshenko, 2005
 Acyrthosiphon fragariaevescae
 Acyrthosiphon fragum Zhang, 1998
 Acyrthosiphon galijae Kadyrbekov, 2005
 Acyrthosiphon genistae Mordvilko, 1914
 Acyrthosiphon ghanii Eastop, 1971
 Acyrthosiphon glaucii
 Acyrthosiphon gossypicola
 Acyrthosiphon gossypii Mordvilko, 1914
 Acyrthosiphon hamiense Zhang, Chen, Zhong & Li, 1999
 Acyrthosiphon heptapotamicum Kadyrbekov, 2005
 Acyrthosiphon hissaricum
 Acyrthosiphon ignotum Mordvilko, 1914
 Acyrthosiphon ilka Mordvilko, 1914
 Acyrthosiphon kamtshatkanum Mordvilko, 1914
 Acyrthosiphon kapustjanae Pashtshenko, 2005
 Acyrthosiphon knechteli (Börner, 1950)
 Acyrthosiphon kondoi Shinji, 1938
 Acyrthosiphon lactucae (Passerini, 1860)
 Acyrthosiphon lambersi Leclant & Remaudière, 1974
 Acyrthosiphon leleji Pashtshenko, 2005
 Acyrthosiphon leonurae Pashtshenko, 2005
 Acyrthosiphon lobkovae Pashtshenko, 2005
 Acyrthosiphon loti (Theobald, 1913)
 Acyrthosiphon macrosiphum (Wilson, 1912)
 Acyrthosiphon malvae (Mosley, 1841)
 Acyrthosiphon matilei Remaudière & Leclant, 2000
 Acyrthosiphon moltshanovi Mordvilko, 1914
 Acyrthosiphon mordvilkoi Nevsky, 1928
 Acyrthosiphon myricae Pashtshenko, 2005
 Acyrthosiphon navozovi Mordvilko, 1914
 Acyrthosiphon nigripes Hille Ris Lambers, 1935
 Acyrthosiphon norvegicum Mordvilko, 1914
 Acyrthosiphon orientale Mordvilko, 1914
 Acyrthosiphon pamiricum Nevsky, 1929
 Acyrthosiphon papaverinum
 Acyrthosiphon papaverisuctum (Zhang, Chen, Zhong & Li, 1999)
 Acyrthosiphon pareuphorbiae Zhang, 1980
 Acyrthosiphon parvum Börner, 1950
 Acyrthosiphon pentatrichopus Hille Ris Lambers, 1974
 Acyrthosiphon phaseoli Chakrabarti, Ghosh & Raychaudhuri, 1971
 Acyrthosiphon pilosum Nieto Nafría, Aldea & Castro, 2015
 Acyrthosiphon pisivorum Zhang, 1980
 Acyrthosiphon pisum (Harris, 1776) (pea aphid)
 Acyrthosiphon porrifolii (Börner, 1950)
 Acyrthosiphon primulae (Theobald, 1913)
 Acyrthosiphon pseudodirhodum (Patch, 1919)
 Acyrthosiphon ranunculum
 Acyrthosiphon rubi Narzikulov, 1957
 Acyrthosiphon rubifoliae
 Acyrthosiphon rumicis Narzikulov, 1969
 Acyrthosiphon saussureae Pashtshenko, 2005
 Acyrthosiphon scalare (Richards, 1963)
 Acyrthosiphon scariolae Nevsky, 1929
 Acyrthosiphon shinanonum Miyazaki, 1971
 Acyrthosiphon soldatovi Mordvilko, 1914
 Acyrthosiphon sophorae Narzikulov & Umarov, 1969
 Acyrthosiphon supranubius Carnero Hernández & Nieto Nafría, 1995
 Acyrthosiphon svalbardicum Heikenheimo, 1968
 Acyrthosiphon thracicum Tashev, 1962
 Acyrthosiphon vandenboschi Hille Ris Lambers, 1974
 Acyrthosiphon vasiljevi
 Acyrthosiphon wasintae (Hottes, 1933)

References

Macrosiphini
Sternorrhyncha genera